Tibor Gemeri (born April 29, 1951) is a Canadian retired soccer player who played with the national team.

Career 
Born in Subotica, SR Serbia, SFR Yugoslavia, he played with FK Crvenka in the Yugoslav Second League before moving to Canada in 1975. Initially he played in the National Soccer League with the Serbian White Eagles FC, and in 1977 with Toronto Italia. He played club football for the Fort Lauderdale Strikers and the Toronto Blizzard in the North American Soccer League.

International career 
Gemeri made his debut for Canada in a scoreless draw on October 25, 1980 in a World Cup qualification match against the United States in Fort Lauderdale. He was replaced at half time by Mike Sweeney.

References

External links
 

1951 births
Living people
Canadian expatriate sportspeople in the United States
Canadian expatriate soccer players
Canada men's international soccer players
Canadian soccer players
Canadian people of Hungarian descent
Expatriate soccer players in the United States
Fort Lauderdale Strikers (1977–1983) players
Naturalized citizens of Canada
American Soccer League (1933–1983) players
North American Soccer League (1968–1984) indoor players
North American Soccer League (1968–1984) players
Sportspeople from Subotica
Serbian emigrants to Canada
Serbian footballers
FK Crvenka players
Utah Golden Spikers players
Toronto Blizzard (1971–1984) players
Toronto Italia players
Serbian White Eagles FC players
Yugoslav emigrants to Canada
Yugoslav footballers
Canadian National Soccer League players
Association football midfielders